Nephlim Modulation Systems (abbreviated NMS) is an American hip hop duo, consisting of Bigg Jus and Orko Eloheim.

In 2003, the group released the first album, Woe to Thee O Land When Thy King Is a Child, on Big Dada. Allmusic gave the album 4 out of 5 stars. Imperial Letters of Protection was released on Big Dada in 2005.

Discography
Albums
 Woe to Thee O Land When Thy King Is a Child (2003)
 Imperial Letters of Protection (2005)

References

External links
  on Big Dada
 

Alternative hip hop groups
American musical duos